Justice Howell may refer to:

David Howell (jurist) (1747–1824), associate justice of the Rhode Island Supreme Court
Edward H. Howell (1915–1994), associate justice of the Oregon Supreme Court
Francis S. Howell (1863–1937), associate justice of the Nebraska Supreme Court
Rufus K. Howell (1820–1890), associate justice of the Louisiana Supreme Court
William Barberie Howell (1865–1927), associate justice and chief justice of the United States Customs Court

See also
Judge Howell (disambiguation)